Audrey Justine Tautou (born 9 August 1976) is a French actress. She made her acting debut at the age of 18 on television and her feature film debut in Venus Beauty Institute (1999), for which she received critical acclaim and won the César Award for Most Promising Actress.

Tautou achieved international recognition for her lead role in the 2001 film Amélie, which met with critical acclaim and was a major box-office success. She has since appeared in films in a range of genres, including the thrillers Dirty Pretty Things (2002) and The Da Vinci Code (2006), and the romantic comedy Priceless (2006). She has received critical acclaim for her many roles including the World War I drama A Very Long Engagement (2004), and for her portrayal of French fashion designer Coco Chanel in the biographical drama Coco avant Chanel (2009). She has been nominated three times for the César Award and twice for the BAFTA for Best Actress in a leading role. In June of 2004, she became one of the few French actors in history to be invited to join the Academy of Motion Picture Arts and Sciences (AMPAS).

Tautou has modeled for Chanel, Montblanc, L'Oréal and many other companies. She is an active supporter of several charities.

Early life 
Tautou was born in Beaumont and was raised in Montluçon. Her father Bernard Tautou is a dental surgeon, and her mother Eveline is a teacher. She was named after actress Audrey Hepburn. Tautou showed an interest in acting at an early age and started her acting lessons at the Cours Florent. There she learned English and Italian.

Acting career

1990s 

In 1998, Tautou participated in a Star Search-like competition sponsored by Canal+ called "Jeunes Premiers" (The Young Debuts) and won Best Young Actress at the 9th Béziers Festival of Young Actors. Tonie Marshall gave her a role in the César-winning Venus Beauty Institute (1999, also known as Vénus beauté (institut)). In 2000, she won the Prix Suzanne Bianchetti as her country's most promising young film actress.

2000s 
In 2001, Tautou rose to international fame for her performance as the eccentric lead in the romantic comedy Amélie (original French title: Le Fabuleux Destin d'Amélie Poulain), a film directed by Jean-Pierre Jeunet. Written by Jeunet with Guillaume Laurant, the film is a whimsical depiction of contemporary Parisian life, set in Montmartre. It tells the story of a shy waitress, who decides to change the lives of those around her for the better, while struggling with her own isolation. The film was an international co-production between companies in France and Germany.

The film met with critical acclaim and was a major box-office success. Amélie won Best Film at the European Film Awards; it won four César Awards (including Best Film and Best Director), two BAFTA Awards (including Best Original Screenplay), and was nominated for five Academy Awards. Grossing over $33 million in limited theatrical release, it is still the highest-grossing French-language film released in the United States.

In 2002, she acted in the British thriller film Dirty Pretty Things directed by Stephen Frears and written by Steven Knight, a drama about two illegal immigrants in London. It was produced by BBC Films and Celador Films. The film was nominated for an Academy Award for Best Original Screenplay and won a British Independent Film Award for "Best Independent British Film" in 2003.

In 2004, she starred in A Very Long Engagement, a romantic war film co-written and directed by Jean-Pierre Jeunet. It is a fictional tale about a young woman's desperate search for her fiancé who might have been killed in the Battle of the Somme, during World War I. It was based on a novel of the same name, written by Sebastien Japrisot, first published in 1991.
In June, she was invited to join the Academy of Motion Picture Arts and Sciences (AMPAS).

In 2005, Tautou starred in her first full Hollywood production, opposite Tom Hanks, in the film version of Dan Brown's best-selling novel The Da Vinci Code, directed by Ron Howard and released in May 2006.

She starred alongside Gad Elmaleh in Pierre Salvadori's Hors de prix (Priceless), released 13 December 2006. The film has been compared to Breakfast at Tiffany's.

Tautou starred with Guillaume Canet in Claude Berri's Ensemble, c'est tout in 2007, an adaptation of the eponymous novel by Anna Gavalda.

2010s–present 
Tautou played the lead role in the biopic of fashion designer Coco Chanel, titled Coco avant Chanel, and directed by Anne Fontaine. Filming began in Paris in September 2008, and released in France on 22 April 2009. The script is partially based on Edmonde Charles-Roux's book "L'Irrégulière" ("The Non-Conformist"). Instead of releasing Coco Before Chanel in the United States itself, Warner Bros. let Sony Pictures Classics handle the release there. The film grossed $6 million in the United States.

Coco Before Chanel was nominated for four BAFTA Awards, three European Film Awards, six César Awards and the Academy Award for Best Costume Design.

In 2011, she appeared in Delicacy, a French romantic comedy-drama directed by David and Stéphane Foenkinos and based on the novel of the same name by David Foenkinos. David was nominated for the 2012 Best Writing (Adaptation) César Award and the film was nominated as Best Film.

She appeared in the music video of "I Love Your Smile", a song by British singer-songwriter Charlie Winston.

She was the host of the opening and closing ceremonies of the 2013 Cannes Film Festival.

She was a member of the jury of the 2015 Berlin Film Festival. She appeared in the 2016 film The Odyssey as Simone Melchior Cousteau.

Public image and modelling career 
Tautou began modelling at a very young age, taking modelling courses and other activities, and has modelled for magazines such as Vogue, Elle, Harper's Bazaar, Marie Claire in many countries, and many others.

Tautou was named in 2009 as the next spokesmodel for Chanel No. 5, replacing Nicole Kidman. She was directed in the advertisement by Jean-Pierre Jeunet, with whom she worked on Amélie and A Very Long Engagement. The advertisement was released in 2009 to coincide with release of Coco before Chanel. She has also become the face of L'Oreal and Montblanc and several other ad campaigns.

Tautou over the years has been declared a fashionista and icon by the press, appearing in many magazines, fashion, beauty, and culture. She has attended major fashion week events around the world as well as smaller events. The press sometimes refers to her as "The Chanel Muse".

Personal life 
She studied at the Institut Catholique de Paris. A church-goer when young, she has stated that she is "not officially" Catholic.

Tautou says she considers France her base, where she plans to focus her career, rather than in the United States. She told Stevie Wong of The Straits Times "I am, at the end of the day, a French actress. I am not saying I will never shoot an English-language movie again, but my home, my community, my career is rooted in France. I would never move to Los Angeles."

Filmography

Film

Television

Theatre

National honours 
  Commandeur de l'Ordre des Arts et des Lettres (2018)

References

External links

New York Daily News Interview 21 November 2004
MSNBC Interview 23 November 2004
UK Story & Interview 16 January 2005
Jon Henley, "It doesn't take much to catch a man" The Guardian, 13 June 2008, interview about Priceless

1976 births
Living people
People from Beaumont, Puy-de-Dôme
Actors from Clermont-Ferrand
French film actresses
20th-century French actresses
21st-century French actresses
Officiers of the Ordre des Arts et des Lettres
Cours Florent alumni
People from Montluçon
French television actresses
Most Promising Actress César Award winners
Best Actress Lumières Award winners
Most Promising Actress Lumières Award winners
French female models
Institut Catholique de Paris alumni
Chopard Trophy for Female Revelation winners